Hungry Jack's Pty Ltd. is an Australian fast food franchise of the Burger King Corporation. It is a wholly-owned subsidiary of Competitive Foods Australia, a privately held company owned by Jack Cowin. Hungry Jack's owns and operates or sub-licences all of the Burger King/Hungry Jack's restaurants in Australia.

As the master franchise for Australia, the company is responsible for licensing new operators, opening its own stores and performing standards oversight of franchised locations in Australia. With over 400 locations across Australia, Hungry Jack's is the second-largest franchise of Burger King in the world (second to Carrols Corporation).

Corporate profile

Early history

When Burger King moved to expand its operations into Australia, it found that its business name was already trademarked by a takeaway food shop in Adelaide, South Australia. As a result, Burger King provided the Australian franchisee, Jack Cowin, with a list of possible alternative names derived from pre-existing trademarks already registered by Burger King and its then corporate parent Pillsbury that could be used to name the Australian restaurants.

Cowin selected the "Hungry Jack" brand name, one of Pillsbury's U.S. pancake mixture products, and slightly changed the name to a possessive form by adding an apostrophe and "s" to form the new name "Hungry Jack's". The first Australian franchise of Burger King Corporation was established in Innaloo, Perth, on 18 April 1971, under the auspices of Cowin's new company Hungry Jack's Pty Ltd.

By the end of its first decade of operation in the 1970s, Hungry Jack's had expanded to 26 stores in three states. In October 1981, the company opened its first New South Wales store in the Sydney central business district on the corner of Liverpool and George Street. In 1986, the chain entered Victoria by purchasing 11 stores from the ailing Wendy's Hamburger chain, later converting them to Hungry Jack's.

1996 to 2001: legal battle with Burger King 
In 1991, Hungry Jack's Pty Ltd. renewed its franchise agreement with Burger King Corporation which allowed the Hungry Jack's to license third party franchisee. However, one of the conditions of the agreement was that Hungry Jack's had to open a certain number of stores every year for the term of the contract. In 1996, shortly after the Australian trademark on the Burger King name lapsed, Burger King Corporation made a claim that Hungry Jack's had violated the conditions of the renewed franchise agreement by failing to expand the chain at the rate defined in the contract and sought to terminate the agreement.

Under the aegis of this claim, Burger King Corporation in partnership with Shell Australia, began to open its own stores in 1997 beginning in Sydney and throughout the Australian regions of New South Wales, Australian Capital Territory, Victoria and Tasmania. In addition, Burger King sought to limit HJ's ability to open new locations in the country, whether they were corporate locations or third-party licensees.

As a result of Burger King's actions, Hungry Jack's owner Jack Cowin and his company Competitive Foods Australia, began legal proceedings in 2001 against the Burger King Corporation, claiming Burger King Corporation had violated the conditions of the master franchising agreement and was in breach of the contract. The Supreme Court of New South Wales agreed with Cowin and determined that Burger King had violated the terms of the contract and awarded Hungry Jack's A$46.9 million (US$41.6 million in 2001).Burger King obtained special leave to appeal to the High Court:, however the appeal was later dismissed by consent: .

In its decision, the Court said that Burger King sought to engineer a default of the franchise agreement so that the company could limit the number of new Hungry Jack's branded restaurants and ultimately claim the Australian market as its own, which was a purpose that was extraneous to the agreement. The case introduced the American legal concept of good faith negotiations into the Australian legal system, which until the time of the verdict had been rarely used in the Australian court systems.

2002 to present

After Burger King Corporation lost the case, it decided to terminate its operations in the country and in July 2002 the company transferred its assets to its New Zealand franchise group, Trans-Pacific Foods (TPF). The terms of the sale had TPF assume oversight of the Burger King franchises in the region as the Burger King brand's master franchisee. Trans-Pacific Foods administered the chain's 81 locations until September 2003 when the new management team of Burger King Corporation reached an agreement with Hungry Jack's Pty Ltd. to rebrand the existing Burger King locations to Hungry Jack's and make Hungry Jack's Pty the sole master franchisee of both brands.

An additional part of the agreement required Burger King Corporation to provide administrative and advertising support as to ensure a common marketing scheme for the company and its products. Trans-Pacific Foods transferred its control of the Burger King franchises to Hungry Jack's Pty Ltd., which subsequently renamed the remaining Burger King locations as "Hungry Jack's," joining the other 210 outlets at the time.

In the 2009 to 2010 financial year, Competitive Foods Australia reported an after-tax profit of $32.1 million on sales of $1.043 billion.

As of September 2021, Hungry Jack's has 440 stores, with 75% being company owned. The company intends to open more than 20 new stores per year in future, with an upper aim of 700 stores in total.

Products

The only Burger King trademarks that are currently sold at Hungry Jack's are the Whopper range of beef burgers and the TenderCrisp range of chicken burgers. Other products sold by Hungry Jack's include the Baconator, the Brekky Wrap range and the Grill Masters premium Angus beef burger range, as well as more generic items such as cheeseburgers, chicken nuggets, and chips.

Hungry Jack's breakfast menu, introduced in late 2005 in three states (Queensland, Western Australia, and Northern Territory) and the other states the following year, bears little resemblance to Burger King's US breakfast menu, and includes items such as English muffins and toasties. In 2021 Hungry Jack's released two new breakfast menu items, the Turkish Brekky BLAT and the Turkish Brekky BLAT with egg. A BLAT sandwich is popular in Australia; the acronym stands for Bacon, Lettuce, Avocado and Tomato.

Due to the increase in popularity of plant-based meat alternatives being consumed across Australia, Hungry Jack's introduced the "Rebel Whopper" in partnership with V2food in late 2019, which is a variation of the Whopper containing a meat-free patty made with protein extracted from legumes. A large promotional campaign was run, including partnering with online creator Natalie Tran. The restaurant also serves a vegan Whopper burger and English muffins, which contain a vegetable patty.

In 2022 Hungry Jack's launched its Jack's Café coffee chain brand as a response to McDonald's McCafé offering.

Big Jack

In mid-2020 the chain introduced the "Big Jack" burger, which is essentially a slightly altered version of the Big King, and similar to McDonald's Big Mac burger. The close similarities in the name, appearance and the marketing of the burger led to McDonald's suing Hungry Jack's in the Federal Court of Australia in August 2020 over trademark infringement, and they sought to cancel Hungry Jack's Big Jack trademark which was filed the previous year. They also accused the company of deliberately copying the ingredients and appearance of the Big Mac in bad faith.

Hungry Jack's argues that the burger's name is simply a play on the company's name and that of its founder Jack Cowin, and that a burger's appearance and composition cannot be protected by a trademark, noting that their product features "common characteristics of hamburgers" sold everywhere. The company eventually released a number of variants of the burger to the range, including a larger version — the Mega Jack, the Outlaw Big Jack (which added bacon and barbeque sauce), and the Chicken Big Jack. The case was expected to return to court in 2021. The burger and all its variants was removed from the menu in late 2021.

Marketing

Logo
The Hungry Jack's logo is still based on the 1994 Burger King logo, despite subsequent revisions to the logo used by Burger King in other markets.

Hungry Jack's Kids Club
Hungry Jack's Kid's Club mascots are unique to the Australian franchisee, as opposed to other international locations that use one of the two existing Burger King kid's mascots, the Burger King Kids' Club or the Honbatz. Hungry Jacks does have a Kid's Club program similar to the US offering, offering themed birthday parties at its restaurants along with its Kid's Club Meals.

Sponsorship
Hungry Jack's retains strong links with Perth: the city's first team in the Australian Football League, the West Coast Eagles, have been sponsored by Hungry Jack's since their entry into the league in 1987.
On 5 October 2017, Hungry Jack's became the naming rights sponsor for the National Basketball League. The Hungry Jack's logo is featured on player jerseys, in and around venues, and the company was closely associated with Heritage Month in January.

See also
 KFC (Jack Cowin previously owned franchises in Western Australia and the Northern Territory.)
V2food
 Domino's Pizza Enterprises (master franchise of Domino's Pizza in Australia, New Zealand and several European countries; Jack Cowin's family trust is the majority shareholder of DPE.)
 List of hamburger restaurants
 List of restaurants in Australia

References

External links

Burger King
Companies based in Sydney
Australian subsidiaries of foreign companies
Fast-food franchises
Fast-food chains of Australia
Fast-food hamburger restaurants
Restaurants established in 1971
Restaurant chains in Australia
1971 establishments in Australia